Miluo East railway station is a railway station located in Miluo, Yueyang, Hunan Province, China. It is on the Wuhan–Guangzhou high-speed railway, a segment of the Beijing–Guangzhou high-speed railway. The station opened in 2009.

Railway stations in Hunan
Railway stations in China opened in 2009
Stations on the Wuhan–Guangzhou High-Speed Railway